Dorothy Elizabeth "Do" Workman (January 5, 1912 – November 30, 1981) was an American tennis player.

Born in King City, Missouri, Workman competed on tour in the 1930s. She was a member of the Los Angeles Tennis Club and attained a best national ranking of sixth. In 1938 she was a singles quarter-finalist at the Australian Championships and made the final of the women's doubles, with Dorothy Bundy. Her doubles partnership with Bundy, known as "Dodo" and "Do", included multiple Pacific Southwest Championships titles.

Grand Slam finals

Women's doubles (1 runner-up)

References

1912 births
1981 deaths
American female tennis players
Tennis people from Missouri
People from King City, Missouri